Sticky Balls is an action puzzle game published by Gizmondo Studios and developed in Manchester and designed by John and Ste Pickford in 2005 for Gizmondo, and later ported to iOS in 2014.

Development
It was initially developed by Zed Two for Pocket PCs. After Zed Two was bought out by Warthog, a version was in development for the PlayStation Portable, until Warthog was bought out by Tiger Telematics and development was switched to the Gizmondo, eventually releasing on May 24, 2005. It was one of only 8 titles available for the handheld console in the United States, and among the 14 games released for the system in Europe. It became the most popular game on the Gizmondo platform.

On May 23, 2014, Fast Pixel Games Ltd released Sticky Balls on iOS devices under the name Sticky Balls Classic. It was popular enough to spawn a sequel, Sticky Balls Soccer, released on June 29, 2014.

Gameplay

Sticky Balls uses a pool-like interface where the player utilizes a spring-loaded rod to shoot brightly colored balls at each other. Bouncing the balls against the table walls doubles the score of the shot but hitting a ball of a different color, or failing to hit anything causes the player to lose a turn.

Rather than pocketing the balls in a pocket like in a traditional pool game, the balls must be stuck together in groups of seven to win the stage. As the game progresses, additional power-ups, bonuses and stage designs offer new challenges.

References

External links

2005 video games
Cancelled PlayStation Portable games
Gizmondo games
IOS games
Puzzle video games
Video games developed in the United Kingdom